Some Things I Know is the second studio album by American country music artist Lee Ann Womack. It was released in 1998 and rose to the #20 position on the Billboard Top Country Albums chart. The album's first two singles, "A Little Past Little Rock" and "I'll Think of a Reason Later," both peaked at number 2 on the U.S. Billboard Hot Country Singles & Tracks chart. Additionally, "(Now You See Me) Now You Don't" reached the Top 20 on the chart. The album's fourth and final single, "Don't Tell Me," failed to reach the Top 40 on the chart.

Background
Womack told Billboard, "I didn't venture out too much or change anything, really, but went with the same process as the first: an extensive song search, plus writing with some other writers at Tree."

Critical reception

Editors at Billboard gave the album a positive review and wrote, "Lee Ann Womack's sophomore album is a solid collection of bedrock country songs that tap elemental emotions. The current single, "A Little Past Little Rock," is a blue-chip country weeper. The real gem here, though, is Bobby Braddock's composition "I'd Rather Have What We Had." The writer of such country classics as George Jones' "He Stopped Loving Her Today," Braddock has penned a cheating song for the ages with "I'd Rather Have What We Had." And Womack brings home the groceries with her emotional delivery." Bill Friskics-Warren of The Washington Post gave the album a mixed review and wrote, "Some Things I Know" has its share of winning moments, but the record is not, as some have hailed it, the traditional country album of the year. Given more sensitive production, as well as the inclusion of more material that suited Womack's vocal strengths, it might have come close, though." Mario Tarradel of The Dallas Morning News listed it as the second best country album of 1998 and wrote, "Ms. Womack followed up her marvelous self-titled debut album with an equally stellar effort that once again honors rich country traditions. But this is no history lesson. Some Things I Know is filled with songs and performances that chronicle everyday life with elegance and emotion." Brian Mansfield of USA Today also listed it as the second best album of 1998 and he wrote, "Womack's delicate, vulnerable soprano is one of the most beautiful sounds in contemporary country, and the style and tone of her second album place her squarely in the footsteps of greats like Dolly Parton, Tammy Wynette and Loretta Lynn." Allmusic's Brian Wahlert was less favorable, saying that "It seems that producer Mark Wright has made an effort to soften Womack's sound to make it more palatable to country radio, but in the process he has removed the soul of her music."

Track listing

Charts

Weekly charts

Year-end charts

References

1998 albums
MCA Records albums
Lee Ann Womack albums
Albums produced by Mark Wright (record producer)